Carder may refer to:
 Carder (name), a surname
 A practitioner of carding, a method of preparing wool for use as a textile
 A practitioner of carding, in the context of credit card fraud

See also
 Carding (disambiguation)